Ezedin Belgasem Faraj Tlish (April 5, 19821 August 2011) was a Libyan taekwondo practitioner. Tlish was among thousands of civilians who were killed during the Libyan Civil War in 2011.

Tlish made his official debut for the 2004 Summer Olympics in Athens, where he competed for the men's flyweight category (58 kg). He lost the first preliminary match by a total knockout to Chinese Taipei's Chu Mu-yen, who eventually became an Olympic champion in the final.

At the 2008 Summer Olympics in Beijing, Tlish switched to a heavier class by competing in the men's lightweight division (68 kg). He was disqualified from the competition for unknown reasons, allowing his first opponent Dmitriy Kim of Uzbekistan to be given an automatic free pass for the subsequent round.

References

External links

NBC Olympics Profile

1982 births
2011 deaths
Libyan male taekwondo practitioners
Olympic taekwondo practitioners of Libya
Taekwondo practitioners at the 2004 Summer Olympics
Taekwondo practitioners at the 2008 Summer Olympics
People killed in the First Libyan Civil War
21st-century Libyan people
Olympians killed in warfare